The Emgrand EC8 is a large family car of the Emgrand sub-brand of Chinese automaker Geely.

Background
The Emgrand EC8 debuted at the 2010 Beijing Auto Show. Formerly known as Emgrand EC825, Geely decided simply name the car Emgrand EC8. 

The EC8 is Geely's first entry to the D-segment mid-size sedan or Large family car market. The car resembles a cross between the Toyota Camry (XV40) and the Cadillac CTS as the EC8 was benchmarked against and reverse engineered from the Toyota Camry. The Geely EC8 will compete with mid-size rivals such as the Toyota Camry, Volkswagen Magotan, Honda Accord, Nissan Teana and Chery-Riich G5 in the Chinese market.

References

External links

http://chinaautoweb.com/2010/10/geely-releases-all-new-emgrand-mid-size-sedan-ec8/

EC8
Mid-size cars
Front-wheel-drive vehicles
Sedans
Cars introduced in 2010
2010s cars